Max FM may also refer to:
 Max FM; two music radio stations, in Lagos, Nigeria and Abuja, Nigeria
 MAX FM, KMAX-FM, Wellington, Colorado, United States
 2MAX, Max FM, Narrabri, New South Wales, Australia
 CFQM-FM, 103.9 Max FM, Moncton, New Brunswick, Canada
 CHER-FM, Max 98.3 FM, Sydney, Nova Scotia, Canada
 CHGB-FM, 97.7 Max FM, Wasaga Beach, Ontario, Canada
 CISO-FM, 89.1 Max FM, Orilla, Ontario, Canada
 CKOD-FM, 103.1 Max FM,  Salaberry-de-Valleyfield, Quebec, Canada
 DXDN-FM, 103.3 Max FM, Midsayap, Cotabato, Philippines
 DXXR, 95.9 Max FM, General Santos, South Cotabato, Philippines
 KERX, 95.3 Max FM, Paris, Arkansas, United States
 Max 107.3, Mid North Coast, New South Wales, Australia
 WMAX-FM, Holland, Michigan, United States
 WRPQ, 99.7 Max FM, Baraboo, Wisconsin, United States
 WYMR (FM), MAX 98.3 FM, Culver, Indiana, United States

Former stations 
 CJSP-FM, 92.7 Max-FM (2011–2012), Leamington, Ontario, Canada
 DWKX, 103.5 Max FM (2005–2010), Madaluyong, Philippines
 KGMZ-FM, Max FM (2005–2007), San Francisco, California, United States
 KLKC-FM, Max FM, Parsons, Kansas, United States
 KLRX, MAX-FM (2005–2007), Lee's Summit, Missouri, United States
 KMAX-FM, MAX-FM (2002–2012), Wellington, Colorado, United States
 KMXN, KKYD, 92.9 Max FM (2005–2006), Osage City, Kansas, United States
 KPSL-FM, KVMX, 96-5 Max-FM (2008–2011), Bakersfield, California, United States
 KQKZ, KVMX, The 92-1 Max FM (2011–2013), Bakersfield, California, United States
 WAOL, Max FM (1993–2013), Ripley, Ohio, United States
 WKCA, Max FM (2005–2007), Morehead, Kentucky, United States
 WKZF, WDQX, Max FM (2005–2013), Morton, Illinois, United States
 WOXY (FM), Max FM (2004–2010), Oxford / Mason, Ohio, United States
 WVBW-FM, WXMM, 100.5 MAX-FM (2003–2005), Norfolk, Virginia, United States
 XHPRS-FM, Max FM (2014–2019), Tecate, Baja California, Mexico
 XHMRL-FM, Max FM, Morelia, Michoacán, Mexico

See also